Waconia Public Schools (ISD 110) serves approximately 4,000 students in the cities of Waconia, Minnetrista, Victoria, St. Bonifacius, and New Germany. The school district has three elementary schools that serve students in grades K-5; one middle school that serves students in grades 6-8; and one high school that serves students in grades 9-12.

It is located in Carver County and Hennepin County, approximately 35 miles West of Minneapolis.

The District's Mission Statement says "Waconia Public Schools empowers students to explore their passions and create their success by providing opportunities for academic, social, and emotional growth."

History

Beginning in 2001 and up to 2011 its student enrollment increased each year by about 5%. The Minneapolis Star Tribune wrote in 2011 that not very many Minnesota school districts had increasing enrollment. That year there was an $8 million bond referendum so the district could acquire land for a new elementary school and a new high school, but voters rejected it with 2,676 against to 1,050 for it. Due to increasing enrollment preschool classes were moved into a warehouse.

In September 2016, the District opened Laketown Elementary School, the District's third elementary school.

Voters approved referendum questions in 2014, 2018 and 2020 to improve facilities and increase the school district's per pupil general education revenue.

Leadership
Nancy Rajanen served as superintendent until her retirement effective June 30, 2014.

Effective July 1, 2014 Patrick Devine, previously the principal of the middle school of the Litchfield School District, was selected as the district's superintendent. Devine served as Superintendent until June 2022.

Brian Gersich started his tenure as Superintendent on July 1, 2022. Gersich previously served as Superintendent of LeSueur-Henderson Schools and Assistant Superintendent at Burnsville-Eagan-Savage Schools.

Academics
Waconia Public Schools was named the 19th best public school district in the state of Minnesota by Niche. The District has a 95% four-year graduation rate, a 17:1 student to teacher ratio, and 65% of teachers who have advanced degrees.

Schools
 Secondary
 Waconia High School
 Waconia Middle School
 Primary
 Bayview Elementary School
 Laketown Elementary School
 Southview Elementary School
 Preschool
 Early Childhood Center
 Other
 Waconia Learning Center

References

External links
 Waconia Public Schools

School districts in Minnesota
Education in Carver County, Minnesota
Education in Hennepin County, Minnesota